The women's marathon at the 1996 Summer Olympics in Atlanta was held on Sunday July 28, 1996, beginning at 07:05h local time. Sixty-five athletes finished the race while twenty-one dropped out mid-competition. A total of 86 competitors from 51 countries took part. There were also two competitors, Valentina Enachi of Moldova and Virginie Gloum of the Central African Republic, whose results were deemed unofficial due to procedural errors by their federations in submitting their entries in the event.

Medalists

Abbreviations
All times shown are in hours:minutes:seconds

Records

Final ranking

See also
 1995 Women's World Championships Marathon
 1996 Marathon Year Ranking
 1997 Women's World Championships Marathon

References

External links
  Official Report
  Marathon Info

M
Marathons at the Olympics
1996 marathons
1996 Summer Olympics
Summer Olympics marathon
Marathons in the United States
Women's events at the 1996 Summer Olympics